This list of museums in the West Midlands, England contains museums which are defined for this context as institutions (including nonprofit organizations, government entities, and private businesses) that collect and care for objects of cultural, artistic, scientific, or historical interest and make their collections or related exhibits available for public viewing. Also included are non-profit art galleries and university art galleries. Museums that exist only in cyberspace (i.e., virtual museums) are not included.

Defunct museums
 Broadfield House Glass Museum, Kingswinford, closed in 2015
 Coventry City Farm, closed in 2008
 Coventry Toy Museum, Coventry, closed in 2007
 Dudley Museum and Art Gallery, closed in 2016
 Galton Valley Canal Heritage Centre, Smethwick
 Jerome K. Jerome Museum, Walsall, website, currently seeking new facility
 Museum of Science and Industry, Birmingham, closed in 1997, many exhibits now at Thinktank, Birmingham
 Walsall Museum, closed in 2015

See also
:Category:Tourist attractions in the West Midlands (county)

References

 
West Midlands
Museums